Gowzluy-e Olya (also Romanized as Gowzlūy-e ‘Olyā; also known as Gowzlū-ye ‘Olyā) is a village in Ajorluy-ye Gharbi Rural District, Baruq District, Miandoab County, West Azerbaijan Province, Iran. At the 2006 census, its population was 104, in 21 families.

References 

Populated places in Miandoab County